Diosdado "Dodie Boy" Peñalosa (born  November 19, 1962) is a Filipino former professional boxer who competed from 1982 to 1995. He is a world champion in two weight classes, having held the IBF light-flyweight title from 1983 to 1986 and the IBF flyweight title in 1987.

Professional career
Peñalosa won the Philippine light flyweight title on November 26, 1982 by a 12th round stoppage against Romy Austria. He defended it against Alfredo Guanzon on January 30, 1983 although the bout ended in a no-contest for unknown reasons.

In 1983, he became the first IBF light flyweight champion with a technical knockout win over Satoshi Shingaki who would later become the inaugural IBF bantamweight champion.  He defended the title three times before vacating the belt. In 1986, he moved up to challenge WBA Flyweight Title holder Hilario Zapata but lost.

Peñalosa later captured the IBF Flyweight Title the following year with a knockout win over Hi-Sup Shin.  He lost the belt in his first defense to Chang-Ho Choi.  In 1989, he would get another shot at the IBF Flyweight Title against Dave McAuley, but lost a split decision. He retired in 1995.

It was revealed that Peñalosa has been suffering from polio since he was born.

Post retirement
He has since become the trainer of Nonito Donaire after the young boxer had a bitter split with his father.

Together on April 19, 2009, the team defeated Raul Martinez in Donaire's third title defense of his IBF Flyweight championship, a belt he once held in 1987.

Personal life
His younger brother, Gerry Peñalosa, was the WBO bantamweight champion. He has 3 children, including boxers Dodie Boy Peñalosa Jr. and David Penalosa.

See also
 List of light-flyweight boxing champions
 List of flyweight boxing champions
 List of Filipino boxing world champions

References

6. Cris Dela Paz Ilang (1980 to 1983) Strength Conditioning Coach. Manila, Philippines

External links

 

1962 births
Living people
Light-flyweight boxers
Flyweight boxers
Super-flyweight boxers
World light-flyweight boxing champions
World flyweight boxing champions
International Boxing Federation champions
People from San Carlos, Negros Occidental
Boxers from Negros Occidental
Filipino male boxers